The Strathcona Bruins are a Junior B hockey team playing in the Capital Junior Hockey League. The team was renamed the Bruins in 2008 after playing under the name Sabres since 1978.

The Bruins hosted the 2012-13 season All-Star Game at the Ardrossan Recreation Complex. Rookies Jordan Martin, Jeff Bronetto, and Robbie Lloyd represented the Bruins in the Rookie Game, in which the East Rookies defeated the West Rookies 9-8. Keagan Gorda, Dan Ketsa, and Wes Walkeden represented the Bruins in the All-Star Game, which the East won 10-9 in overtime. Ketsa was named MVP of the game for the East.

Home Arena
The Bruins play out of the Strathcona Olympiette Centre (SOC) located in Strathcona County.

"With a capacity of approximately 400 spectator seats and additional standing room around the arena, SOC is one of the largest and brightest facilities in the CJHL. The arena features a fully functional Air Horn and rotating lights above the scoreboard used every time the Bruins score a goal. The facility features a full sized ice surface and miniature ice surface roughly a 1/3 the size of a regular hockey rink. Adjoining the arena, a five-sheet curling rink complete with its own lobby and lounge. Along with a fully functional kitchen located upstairs, SOC is one of the premier multi-purpose facilities located within Strathcona County.
The main ice surface features a full sized centre ice Strathcona Bruins logo, one of the few arenas within the Edmonton area to have that privilege (Rogers Place is the only other arena displaying a logo to that magnitude). In the future the Bruins are looking to add their own private dressing room to accommodate the players, along with a fully functional fitness facility to be located within the arena to be used by the Bruins Junior Hockey Club, and the players and parents who frequently use the facility".

Recent Season-by-season record
Note: GP = Games played, W = Wins, L = Losses, T = Ties, OTL = Overtime Losses, Pts = Points, GF = Goals for, GA = Goals against

Alumni
Jimmy Quinlan            1999-2003
(NLL - Edmonton Rush Lacrosse Club)
Shaun Fisher             1999-2003
(ACAC - Grant MacEwan Griffins)
Ryan Christensen         2000-2004
(ACAC - Concordia Thunder)
Shawn King               2006-2008
(ACAC - Grant MacEwan Griffins)
Greg Lutomski	          2005-2009
Jay Renner	          2008-2010
Casey McGillivray	  2006-2010
Adam Bruce  'C'	  2008-2010
Shawn Heaney	          2008-2010
Dylan Berrecloth	  2009-2010
Andrew Wheeler           2009-2010
(NCAA - University of New England Nor'easters)
Sam Hinse  'A'	          2007-2011
Tyler Gramatovich'A'     2008-2011
Kevin Ruiz	          2009-2011
Brett Richards'C'        2009-2011
(ACAC - Concordia Thunder)
Luke Milne	          2008-2012
Dan Hoyle  'A'	          2008-2012
Tyson Wright  'C'	  2009-2012
Dan Cordeiro  'A'	  2009-2013
Wes Walkeden  'C'	  2008-2013
Michael Figgures	  2009-2013
Evan Tordiff	          2012-2013
Luke Molyneaux	          2012-2013
Cole Porter              2012-2013
(SJHL - LaRonge Ice Wolves)
(CIS - Wilfrid Laurier University Golden Hawks)
Brett Arnston  'C'       2010-2014
Kenny Wood-Schatz	  2011-2014
Max McRae	          2011-2014
Kyle Kramar  'A'	  2011-2014
Keagan Gorda  'A'	  2012-2015
Hayden McReynolds	  2013-2015
Josh Klein  'A'	  2013-2015
Cody Lunnin  'A'	2012-2016
Brett Rossi	2013-2016
Jordan Martin  'C'	2012-2016
Keaton Twohey	2012-2016
Mitch Vigneau 2013-2017
Brent Vigneau 'A' 2013-2017

Award History
Most Valuable Player - Gary Koehli Award
2016 - #91 Brent Vigneau
2015 - #34 Mitch Vigneau
2014 - #11 Keagan Gorda
2013 - #11 Keagan Gorda
2012 - #11 Keagan Gorda
2011 - #10 Tyler Gramatovich
2010 - #14 Dan Hoyle
2009 - #1 Casey McGillivray

Most Points in the Regular Season
2016 - #91 Brent Vigneau - 33 PTS / 35 GP
2015 - #15 Gage Gorda - 65 PTS / 38 GP
2014 - #11 Keagan Gorda - 47 PTS / 34 GP
2013 - #11 Keagan Gorda - 66 PTS / 36 GP
2012 - #11 Keagan Gorda - 56 PTS / 38 GP
2011 - #10 Tyler Gramatovich - 52 PTS / 37 GP
2010 - #14 Dan Hoyle & #9 Michel Chalifoux - 36 PTS / 37 GP
2009 - #10 Tyler Gramatovich

Most Outstanding Defenseman
2016 - #5 Clayton Johnson
2015 - #5 Clayton Johnson & #17 Blade Foster
2014 - #44 Jordan Martin
2013 - #44 Jordan Martin
2012 - #25 Wes Walkeden & #12 Tyson Wright

Rookie of the Year Award - Dan Frogner Trophy
2016 - #11 Chance Herrington
2015 - #88 Justin Miller
2014 - # 1 Mitch Vigneau
2013 - #12 Jeff Bronetto
2012 - #11 Keagan Gorda - CJHL Rookie of the Year
2011 - #22 Dan Ketsa
2010 - #88 Dan Cordiero
2009 - #24 Rob Rudd

Most Improved Player
2016 - #14 Dallas Scarlett
2015 - #8 Dylan Kulmatycki
2014 - #91 Brent Vigneau
2013 - #88 Eli Gallinger
2012 - #5 Michael Brice

Unsung Hero Award
2016 - #37 Brett Young
2015 - #91 Brent Vigneau
2014 - #44 Jordan Martin
2013 - #91 Luke Molyneaux
2011 - #16 Brett Richards
2010 - #44 Joel Henriksen

Most Sportsmanlike Player - Glenn Worrell Trophy
2015 - #44 Jordan Martin - 2 PIM / 33 Gms
2014 - #17 Max McRae - 2 PIM / 24 Gms
2013 - #88 Eli Gallinger - 0 PIM / 35 Gms
2012 - #6 Matt Ohrt - 4 PIM / 30 Gms
2011 - #16 Brett Richards 'C' - CJHL Most Sportsmanlike Player - 2 PIM / 38 Gms
2010 - #88 Dan Cordiero - 6 PIM / 37 Gms
2009 - #44 Joel Henriksen

Playoff Most Valuable Player
2015 - #16 Nic Moulding
2014 - #1 Mitch Vigneau
2010 - #1 Casey McGillivray

Scholastic Player of the Year
2015 - #11 Keagan Gorda - Charles S. Noble Scholarship
2014 - #5 Jarrett Belliveau - Friends of the AJHL Scholarship Recipient
2013 - #33 Micheal Figgures - Friends of the AJHL Scholarship Recipient
2012 - #88 Dan Cordeiro
2011 - #88 Dan Cordeiro
2010 - #7 John Hampton
2009 - #7 John Hampton

Scholastic Awards
2015 - #11 Keagan Gorda, #12 Cody Lunnin, #15 Gage Gorda, #44 Jordan Martin
2012 - #88 Dan Cordiero, #3 Khenan Rutsch, #9 Kyle Kramar & #33 Michael Figgures
2011 - #88 Dan Cordiero
2010 - #7 John Hampton, #10 Tyler Gramatovich, #16 Brett Richards & #91 Luke Milne
2009 - #7 John Hampton & #9 Michel Chalifoux

Individual Season Records
Stats only available from 2009-2016/17 Season

Best Save % in a Single Season
0.926 - #34 Mitch Vigneau (2014/15)
0.912 - #34 Mitch Vigneau (2013/14)
0.907 - #34 Mitch Vigneau (2016/17)
0.905 - #29 Joe Mandrusiak (2011/12)
0.904 - #33 Robbie Lloyd (2012/13)
0.901 - #33 Michael Figgures (2012/13)
0.887 - #33 Robbie Lloyd (2013/14)
0.885 - #33 Michael Figgures (2011/12)

Lowest G.A.A. in the Regular Season
2.66 - #34 Mitch Vigneau (2014/15)
3.56 - #01 Joe Mandrusiak (2011/12)
3.59 - #34 Mitch Vigneau (2013/14)
3.68 - #34 Mitch Vigneau (2016/17)
3.96 - #33 Michael Figgures (2011/12)
4.15 - #1 Casey McGillivray (2009/10)

Most Saves in a Single Game
59 - #1 Casey McGillivray (2009/10 - 124:01 mins)
52 - #1 Casey McGillivray (2009/10 - 91:03 mins)
50 - #29 Joe Mandrusiak (2011/12 - 60:00 mins)

Most Wins in the Regular Season
18 - #34 Mitch Vigneau (2014/15)
11 - #34 Mitch Vigneau (2016/17)
11 - #33 Michael Figgures (2010/11)
8 - #1 Casey McGillivray (2009/10)
8 - #29 Jesse Melnychyn (2010/11)
8 - #34 Mitch Vigneau (2013/14)

Most Assists in the Regular Season
35 - #15 Gage Gorda (F) (2014/15)
31 - #11 Keagan Gorda (F) (2014/15)
31 - #11 Keagan Gorda (F) (2012/13)
27 - #11 Keagan Gorda (F) (2011/12)
24 - #84 Dan Cordeiro (F) (2011/12)
24 - #25 Wes Walkeden (D) (2010/11)
24 - #11 Keagan Gorda (F) (2013/14)
24 - #08 Dylan Kulmatycki (F) (2016/17)
22 - #44 Jordan Martin (D) (2014/15)
22 - #84 Dan Cordiero (F) (2012/13)

Most Goals in the Regular Season
35 - #11 Keagan Gorda (F) (2011/12)
34 - #10 Tyler Gramatovich (F) (2010/11)
30 - #15 Gage Gorda (F) (2014/15)
26 - #84 Dan Cordiero (F) (2012/13)
23 - #11 Keagan Gorda (F) (2014/15)
23 - #11 Keagan Gorda (F) (2013/14)

Most Points in the Regular Season
66 - #11 Keagan Gorda (F) (2012/13)
65 - #15 Gage Gorda (F) (2014/15)
56 - #11 Keagan Gorda (F) (2011/12)
54 - #10 Tyler Gramatovich (F) (2010/11)
54 - #11 Keagan Gorda (F) (2014/15)
48 - #84 Dan Cordiero (F) (2012/13)
47 - #11 Keagan Gorda (F) (2013/14)
40 - #84 Dan Cordeiro (F) (2011/12)

Most PIM in the Regular Season
207 - #16 Aaron Tiessen (F) (2013/14)
175 - #18 Brett Arnston (F) (2011/12)
171 - #22 Dan Ketsa (F) (2010/11)
167 - #18 Brett Arnston (F) (2013/14)
161 - #11 Kevin Ruiz (F) (2009/10)
146 - #4 Josh Klein (D) (2014/15)
142 - #25 Wes Walkeden (D) (2009/10)

Individual Career Records
Stats only available from 2009-2016/17 Season

Save %
0.907 - #34 Mitch Vigneau (2013–2017)
0.875 - #1  Jacob Suppes (2014-2015)
0.866 - #1  Kit Liske (2015–present)
0.743 - #33 Robbie Lloyd (2011-2014)

GAA
3.61 - #34 Mitch Vigneau (2013-2017)
4.09 - #1 Casey McGillivray (2009-2010)
4.20 - #29 Joe Mandrusiak (2010-2012)
4.49 - #1  Jacob Suppes (2014-2015)
4.59 - #33 Michael Figgures (2009-2013)
4.65 - #29 Jesse Melnychyn (2010-2011)
4.80 - #33 Robbie Lloyd (2011-2014)
5.64 - #1  Kit Liske (2015–present)

Wins
51 - #34 Mitch Vigneau (2013-2017)
31 - #33 Michael Figgures (2009-2013)
14 - #33 Robbie Lloyd (2011-2014)
9 - #1 Casey McGillivray (2009-2010)
7 - #29 Jesse Melnychyn (2010-2011)
6 - #29 Joe Mandrusiak (2010-2012)
3 - #1  Jacob Suppes (2014-2015)

Assists (Minimum 50)
122 - #11 Keagan Gorda (F) (2011-2015)
79 - #84 Dan Cordeiro (F) (2009-2013)
59 - #44 Jordan Martin (D) (2012-2016)
59 - #08 Dylan Kulmatycki (F) (2014–present)
58 - #25 Wes Walkeden (D) (2009-2013)
53 - #91 Brent Vigneau (F) (2013-2017)
51 - #15 Gage Gorda (F) (2013-2015)
50 - #12 Tyson Wright (D) (2009-2012)

Goals (Minimum 30)
116 - #11 Keagan Gorda (F) (2011-2015)
67 - #84 Dan Cordeiro (F) (2009-2013)
51 - #10 Tyler Gramatovich (F) (2009-2011)
45 - #15 Gage Gorda (F) (2013-2015)
41 - #14 Dan Hoyle (F) (2009-2012)
37 - #91 Brent Vigneau (F) (2013-2017)
33 - #22 Dan Ketza (F) (2010-2014)
31 - #08 Dylan Kulmatycki (F) (2014–present)
30 - #76 Keaton Twohey (F) (2012-2016)

Points (Minimum 70)
238 - #11 Keagan Gorda (F) (2011-2015)
146 - #84 Dan Cordeiro (F) (2009-2013)
97 - #15 Gage Gorda (F) (2013-2015)
90 - #91 Brent Vigneau (F) (2013-2017)
90 - #08 Dylan Kulmatycki (F) (2014–present)
86 - #10 Tyler Gramatovich (F) (2009-2011)
82 - #25 Wes Walkeden (D) (2009-2013)
80 - #14 Dan Hoyle (F) (2009-2012)
72 - #44 Jordan Martin (D) (2012-2016)
70 - #12 Tyson Wright (D) (2009-2012)

Games Played (Minimum 120)
156 - #84 Dan Cordeiro (F) (2009-2013)
153 - #44 Jordan Martin (D) (2012-2016)
146 - #11 Keagan Gorda (F) (2011-2015)
143 - #91 Brent Vigneau (F) (2013-2017)
145 - #25 Wes Walkeden (D) (2009-2013)
129 - #12 Cody Lunnin (D) (2012-2016)
124 - #34 Mitch Vigneau (G) (2013-2017)
121 - #18 Brett Arnston (F) (2010-2014)
121 - #12 Tyson Wright (D) (2009-2012)
120 - #05 Clayton Johnson (D) (2014–present)

Penalty Minutes (Minimum 250)
649 - #18 Brett Arnston (F) (2010-2014)
477 - #25 Wes Walkeden (D) (2009-2013)
419 - #22 Dan Ketza (F) (2010-2014)
382 - #12 Cody Lunnin (D) (2012-2016)
330 - #12 Tyson Wright (D) (2009-2012)
276 - #16 Nic Moulding (F) (2014-2016)
269 - #14 Michael Scott (F) (2009-2013)
252 - #91 Brent Vigneau (F) (2013-2017)
251 - #88 Kenny Wood-Schatz (F) (2011-2014)

Team Records
Longest Playoff Games
124.01 - Knights (3) @ Bruins (4) (02/15/2010 - Longest Game in CJHL History )
91.03 - Bruins (4) @ Chiefs (3) (2/23/2010 - 6 periods)

Most Wins in the Regular Season
20 - Strathcona Bruins (2010/11 - Head Coach: Derek Sweet-Coulter)
18 - Strathcona Bruins (2014/15 - Head Coach - Derek Hemsley)
17 - Strathcona Bruins (2013/14 - Head Coach: Derek Hemsley)
16 - Strathcona Bruins (2011/12 - Head Coach: Derek Sweet-Coulter)
14 - Strathcona Bruins (2012/13 - Head Coach: Derek Hemsley)
12 - Strathcona Bruins (2009/10 - Head Coach: Derek Sweet-Coulter)
12 - Strathcona Bruins (2016/17 - Head Coach: Bruce Leiter)

Goals Scored in the Regular Season
154 - 2010/11 Season
150 - 2012/13 Season
145 - 2013/14 Season
137 - 2011/12 Season
129 - 2014/15 Season
121 - 2009/10 Season
113 - 2016/17 Season
99  - 2015/16 Season

Fewest Goals Against in the Regular Season
136 - 2014/15 Season
156 - 2011/12 Season
162 - 2013/14 Season
171 - 2016/17 Season
173 - 2009/10 Season & 2010/11 Season
174 - 2015/16 Season
188 - 2012/13 Season

Most PIM's in the Regular Season
1676 - 2011/12 Season
1495 - 2013/14 Season
1473 - 2015/16 Season
1239 - 2010/11 Season
1116 - 2014/15 Season
1012 - 2009/10 Season
918 - 2012/13 Season
876 - 2016/17 Season

CJHL History
"The Capital Junior Hockey League was established in 1972. At that time it was known as "Edmonton Metropolitan Junior Hockey League. Many excellent hockey players were leaving Alberta to play junior hockey elsewhere. Sometimes, their education and family life suffered, in other cases, "turned off" by the experience, they quit and returned home.
A group of Edmonton and district businessmen felt that there was a need to offer an alternate choice. They planned a program that would be developmental and recreational, a program where players could develop hockey and life skills in harmony. A program that maintains a competitive brand of hockey with recreation value.
The directors of the Capital Junior Hockey League feel they provide this environment. What more could be said about a junior hockey program where the players can live at home and play competitive junior hockey. In familiar surroundings, players can work, go to school, or attend any other academic institution.
The Capital Junior Hockey League is proud that many of their players continued on in hockey. They are especially proud of the hockey environment their program extends to all the players and coaches.
The Capital Junior Hockey league was incorporated in January 1973. The members were the U of A Junior Bears, South Side Athletic Club, North Side Club, Sherwood Park Knights, St. Albert Juniors, and the Fort Saskatchewan Hawks. Two of these are still members: Sherwood Park and Fort Saskatchewan."

Presidents

2007–Present	Jim McAuley
1986-2007	Gary Bruce
1985-1986	Chris Deakin
1980-1985	Tom Meters
1975-1980	Dave Lilycrop
1973-1975	W.B Parker

See also
 List of ice hockey teams in Alberta

External links
CJHL

References

Ice hockey teams in Alberta